Suzy Bloom is a film and stage actress whose credits range from West End plays and musicals to BAFTA nominated film and mainstream television drama.

Suzy stars as Daisy alongside Noel Fielding and Julian Barrett (The Mighty Boosh) in the BAFTA nominated short film Sweet by James A. Pilkington.

Suzy recently played Dotty/Mrs Clackett in “Noises Off” (standing in for Meera Syal) at The Garrick Theatre. She also played Belinda (standing in for Sarah Hadland).

Other credits include, “Gina" opposite Oscar winning actor F Murray Abraham (Amadeus) in the brilliant new play "The Mentor" at The Vaudeville Theatre in London's West End. The play “Stepping Out” (also Vaudeville) where Suzy stepped in for Amanda Holden and took over the role of "Vera" while Amanda was filming Britain's Got Talent. Velma Kelly in "Chicago" (Adelphi, West End Live, Gala performances and many special events), Bombalurina in "Cats" (New London), Jessie Matthews in “Over My Shoulder” the Jessie Matthews’ Story (Jermyn Street), Becky Sharp in “Vanity Fair” (Covent Garden Festival), Snookie Updergraff in "110 In The Shade" (Fortune), “Hot Mikado” (Queen's Theatre), "Smokey Joes Cafe" (Prince Of Wales), "Hey Mr Producer" (Lyceum), The Kid in "Pal Joey" (Chichester Festival Theatre), Diana Lake in Rattigan's "French Without Tears", Becky Sharp in "Vanity Fair" (both at The Northcott), Gwendolen Carr in "Travesties" by Tom Stoppard, Maggie Tulliver in "Mill On The Floss" (Nottingham Playhouse), Sally in Terry Johnson's "Cleo, Camping, Emmanuelle and Dick" (Harrogate Theatre). Suzy is part of the musical comedy trio "Ladies Go Diva" performing at the award-winning cabaret venue, The Crazy Coqs in Piccadilly and Cafe de Paris, London. For radio she has been a guest on "Ned Sherrin's Loose Ends" (BBC radio 4) and has recently played Tamarind in the brand new Doctor Who spin off series "Lady Christina” for Big Finish Audio Drama. Television and film work includes, Patsy in "Snuff Box" with Matt Berry and Rich Fulcher (BBC3), Rachel in "Genie In The House" (Nickelodeon), Julie in EastEnders (BBC), Tamara in Casualty (BBC), Rik Mayall's wife in "Noble England", Rosie in "24 Hours In London" (One World Films) and Daisy opposite Noel Fielding in the award-winning and BAFTA nominated short film “Sweet”. Suzy plays Miss Gilbert in Universal Pictures feature film “EMMA”.

Her quirky stand-up comedy routines can regularly be seen at many of London's comedy venues. Including at Greenwich, Camden, Shoreditch and others.

References

External links

Entry at spotlight.com

British film actresses
Living people
Year of birth missing (living people)